Sedrick Dwayne Ellis (born July 9, 1985) is a former American football defensive tackle.  He played college football for the University of Southern California (USC), and earned unanimous All-American honors.  He was drafted by the New Orleans Saints seventh overall in the 2008 NFL Draft.

Early years
Ellis was born in Chino, California.  Ellis prepped at Chino High School. He was involved with teams that went to back to back CIF title games 2000, 2001.  Ellis, along with teammate Chris McFoy, who was on these Chino teams, played in the NFL.  While in high school Ellis played defensive tackle and fullback in goal line situations.

College career
Ellis attended the University of Southern California, where he played for coach Pete Carroll's USC Trojans football team from 2003 to 2007.  As an underclassman, he learned under All-American Mike Patterson  Ellis finished his redshirt junior season at USC during the 2006 season.  He was first team coaches and Rivals.com All-Pac-10 conference, first-team College Football News All-American and won the Morris Trophy. Ellis was a major force in USC's victory over then-No. 3 Michigan in the 2007 Rose Bowl, recording a season-high seven tackles, a sack and a pass deflection. Following the performance, Ellis considered making the jump to the NFL in the 2007 NFL Draft but decided to come back for his senior season and would go pro in 2008; part of his decision to stay was tied to classmate and highly touted defensive lineman Lawrence Jackson.

Bench pressing more than 500 pounds, he was the strongest player on the Trojans roster and was named one of the "Pac-10's Top 10 Players" by Sports Illustrated going into the 2007 season.  At the end of the 2007 season, Ellis was voted the Pacific-10 Conference Defensive Player of the Year by league coaches, and was selected to the all-conference first team.

Ellis was recognized as a unanimous first-team All-American, having received first-team honors from the Associated Press, American Football Coaches Association, Football Writers Association of America, Walter Camp Football Foundation and The Sporting News, SI.com, Rivals.com.

In addition to benching a team-best , at the 2007 spring pro day Ellis hoisted 225 lb 42 times. Because of his strength, the Trojans had to purchase a set of 200-pound dumbbells for their weight room just to accommodate him (the previous high were 160s); Ellis would do sets of eight reps on the incline bench with the 200s.

Career statistics

Professional career

Pre-draft

Bench Press: ; Squat:

New Orleans Saints
Ellis was drafted by the New Orleans Saints seventh overall in the 2008 NFL Draft. The Saints original draft spot was 10th, but they traded up with the New England Patriots. The teams swapped first round picks, the Saints gave up their third round selection (78th) and the Pats gave back their fifth round selection (164th). The Patriots used the tenth pick to select linebacker Jerod Mayo.

Initially, New Orleans attempted to trade up for LSU DT Glenn Dorsey, whom they had valued higher than Ellis. They had purportedly offered a deal to the Kansas City Chiefs which included their first- and second-round picks and their first-round pick in the 2009 NFL Draft but the Chiefs decided to draft Dorsey instead.

In New Orleans, Ellis was reunited with Saints defensive line coach Ed Orgeron, who was his assistant coach at USC for his freshman year and responsible for recruiting him.  Extended negotiations over contract details, not uncommon with high draft picks, led the defensive tackle to miss six days and 12 practices of training camp until a contract was agreed to on July 29.  His initial five-year contract is worth a maximum value of $49 million, with $19.5 million in guarantees; however portions are based on hard-to-reach incentives that may bring the realized value of the agreement lower.

2008 season
Ellis started and played 13 regular season games in his rookie season for the Saints, who finished 8-8. Sedrick recorded 30 tackles (20 solo) and 4 sacks.

2009 season
Ellis started and played 10 regular season games in his second season with the Saints, who finished 13-3 and went on to win Super Bowl XLIV. He recorded 34 tackles (26 solo) and 2 sacks in the regular season. Ellis started at Defensive Tackle for the Saints in the Super Bowl, recording three tackles.

2010 season
Ellis started and played in all 16 regular season games for the Saints for the first time in his NFL career, recording 44 tackles (30 solo), which marked a career high. Ellis also led all Saints defenders with 6 sacks on the year. New Orleans finished 11-5, good for 2nd place in the NFC South. Ellis started at defensive tackle in the Saints' Wild Card playoff loss to the Seattle Seahawks, recording 3 total tackles.

2011 season
Ellis started all but one game during the Saints 13-3 run in 2011 that resulted in another NFC South title. He had 32 tackles (including playoffs) and four passes defended.

2012 season
Ellis started and played in all 16 regular season games, recording 36 tackles (23 solo).

Chicago Bears
On June 11, 2013, Ellis signed a one-year contract with the Chicago Bears, a team that had a top five defense in yards and point-per-game allowed the year prior.

On July 25, 2013, Ellis did not report to training camp and advised the Bears of his intention to retire from the NFL.

NFL career statistics

Personal

References

External links
New Orleans Saints bio
USC Trojans bio

1985 births
Living people
All-American college football players
American football defensive tackles
Chicago Bears players
New Orleans Saints players
People from Chino, California
Sportspeople from San Bernardino County, California
USC Trojans football players
Players of American football from California